The 1978–79 Rutgers Scarlet Knights men's basketball represented Rutgers University as a member of the Eastern Athletic Association during the 1978–79 NCAA Division I men's basketball season. The head coach was Tom Young, then in his sixth season with the Scarlet Knights. The team played its home games in Louis Brown Athletic Center in Piscataway, New Jersey. The Scarlet Knights won the EAA tournament to reach the NCAA tournament, where they defeated Georgetown in the second round to reach the Sweet Sixteen. Rutgers would lose to St. John's – a team they beat twice during the regular season – in the East Regional semifinal to finish with a record of 22–9 (7–3 EAA).

Roster

Schedule and results

|-
!colspan=9 style=| Regular season

|-
!colspan=9 style=| EAA tournament

|-
!colspan=9 style=| NCAA tournament

Rankings

Team players drafted into the NBA

References 

Rutgers Scarlet Knights men's basketball seasons
Rutgers
Rutgers
1978 in sports in New Jersey
1979 in sports in New Jersey